The 2006 Minnesota State Auditor election was held on November 7, 2006. Incumbent Republican Patricia Anderson was defeated by former State Representative Rebecca Otto of the Minnesota Democratic–Farmer–Labor Party (DFL). Independence Party of Minnesota candidate Lucy Gerold finished third.

Candidates
 Republican: Incumbent Patricia Anderson
 Democratic–Farmer–Labor: Former State Representative Rebecca Otto
 Independence: Lucy Gerold
 Green: Dave Berger

Results
The election was not close with Otto taking 56 of the state’s 87 counties, and winning by a margin of 10.84%. Otto performed well in Hennepin County home of Minneapolis, the most populous county in the state. Otto also performed well in Ramsey County of the state capital St. Paul. Otto also fared well in the Minneapolis suburbs. Anderson did win some rural areas of the state. Since this election this office has remained in Democratic hands.

References

2006 Minnesota elections
Minnesota State Auditor elections
November 2006 events in the United States
Minnesota